Adult Contemporary is a chart published by Billboard ranking the top-performing songs in the United States in the adult contemporary music (AC) market.  In 2008, six different songs topped the chart in 52 issues of the magazine, based on weekly airplay data from radio stations compiled by Nielsen Broadcast Data Systems.

At the start of the year Josh Groban was at number one with "I'll Be Home For Christmas", retaining the top spot from the final chart of 2007.  The song was Groban's fifth track to reach number one on the Adult Contemporary chart.  The following week, Colbie Caillat replaced Groban in the top spot with "Bubbly". The song went on to spend 19 consecutive weeks atop the chart, the highest number of weeks spent at number one by a song during the year.  As no artist had more than one chart-topper during 2008, it also meant that Caillat was the artist with the most weeks in the top spot during the year.  "Bubbly" was the debut single for Caillat, who had gained a major-label recording contract after achieving popularity on social media site MySpace.

In the issue of Billboard dated May 24, Sara Bareilles replaced Caillat at number one with her song "Love Song", which went on to spend 13 consecutive weeks at number one, before being replaced by "Bleeding Love" by Leona Lewis, the winner of the 2006 season of British TV talent show The X Factor.  To date, "Bleeding Love", which also topped Billboards all-genre singles chart, the Hot 100, is the British's singer's only song to reach number one on the Adult Contemporary chart.  Another TV contest winner, American Idol season 7 winner David Cook, reached number one on the chart dated September 20 with "The Time of My Life", the "coronation single" released immediately after his victory in the competition.  Cook's arrival in the top spot brought to an end an unbroken 36-week occupation of the number-one position by female vocalists.  After a single week at number one, "The Time of My Life" was replaced in the top spot for two weeks by "Bleeding Love", but in early October Cook's single returned to number one and remained there for ten consecutive weeks.  On the chart dated December 20, Faith Hill replaced Cook at number one with "A Baby Changes Everything", which spent the last two weeks of 2008 at number one.

Chart history

See also
2008 in music
List of artists who reached number one on the U.S. Adult Contemporary chart

References

2008
United States Adult Contemporary
2008 in American music